The Iglesia ni Cristo Central Temple is a main temple of the Philippine-based Christian religion, the Iglesia ni Cristo. Located along Commonwealth Avenue corner Central Avenue in Quezon City, it was completed on July 27, 1984, and is the biggest church/place of worship in the whole country for all religions as per the dimensions are concerned with a capacity of around 7,000 people.

Background
Built on complex of the INC Central Office, the Temple was erected fifteen years after the completion of the Central Office. It was designed to hold around 7,000 worshipers, accommodating some 3,000 in the main hall and 1,900 in its two side chapels. In addition, the ground floor sanctuary, connected to the main hall by video circuit, can accommodate an excess crowd of around 2,000. The sanctuary has a large baptistery pool designed for the simultaneous baptism of up to 600 people.

In 2014, a 20-ton pipe organ with 3,162 individual pipes custom made by American firm A.E. Schlueter Pipe Organ Company, was installed within the period of 14 months in time for the 30th anniversary celebrations of the Central Temple on July 27. The organ was first played during the special worship service held on July 5, 2014.

While standing both as seat of the Central District and the principal chapel of the Church, under its latter role also the ecclesiastical seat of the Executive Minister, it is organized in a similar manner as other locales, led by a Church-appointed resident minister, assisted by other ministers, assigned evangelical workers and lay staff.

References

External links

Gothic Revival church buildings in the Philippines
Central Temple
Churches in Quezon City
Religious buildings and structures completed in 1984
20th-century religious buildings and structures in the Philippines